Divine Word College is a private undergraduate Roman Catholic seminary run by the Society of the Divine Word in Epworth, Iowa. It was founded by the Divine Word Missionaries in 1964. It educates students for missionary service in the Catholic Church as priests, brothers, sisters, and laypersons.  It is owned and operated by the Society of the Divine Word (SVD). The college offers three baccalaureate degrees as well as English classes as a second language (ESL) to other Catholic religious missionaries and those aspiring to Catholic lay ministries.

During their final semester of undergraduate studies at Divine Word College, young men who choose to continue with the SVD may apply for the Society's one-year novitiate program at the Chicago Province Headquarters in Techny, Illinois. These men may then apply to profess first vows as members of the Society near the end of the novitiate program and continue with seminary studies at the Chicago Theologate.

History
Founded in 1875 in Steyl, the Netherlands, the Roman Catholic order The Society of the Divine Word (SVD) sent the first Divine Word Missionary, Fr. Joseph Freinademetz, SVD, to China by 1879. In 1895, Brother Wendelin Meyer, SVD, went to America. By 1909, the Society had established the first seminary in the United States with the mission of training priest and brother candidates for service in foreign missions. The Society of the Divine Word originally established a Divine Word Seminary, a four-year liberal arts college, in 1912 at Techny, Illinois. In 1931, the Society purchased property in Epworth, Iowa, where it established St. Paul's Mission House, an SVD high school seminary. In 1964, Divine Word College replaced the high school seminary and has since served as the principal site of SVD undergraduate seminary education in the United States.

References

External links 
 Official website

Divine Word Missionaries Order
Men's universities and colleges in the United States
Catholic seminaries in the United States
Roman Catholic Archdiocese of Dubuque
Educational institutions established in 1931
Catholic universities and colleges in Iowa
1931 establishments in Iowa
Educational institutions established in 1964
1964 establishments in Iowa